The Exploding Girl is a 2009 American independent film written and directed by Bradley Rust Gray, starring Zoe Kazan and Mark Rendall. It premiered at the Berlin International Film Festival in 2009 and was released theatrically in the United States on March 12, 2010.

Plot 

Ivy is a college student suffering from juvenile myoclonic epilepsy, who has returned home to Brooklyn for spring break. While she stays at her mother's house, her childhood friend Al, also home from college, asks to crash on their couch as his parents have rented out his room. Over the course of the break, Ivy and Al spend most of their time together, strengthening their already deep bond, especially after Ivy's distant college boyfriend breaks up with her via telephone.

Cast 
 Zoe Kazan as Ivy
 Mark Rendall as Al
 Maryann Urbano as Mom
 Franklin Pipp as Greg's voice

Production 
The Exploding Girl was shot in the guerrilla filmmaking tradition on-location in New York City.

Awards 
Zoe Kazan won Best Actress at the Tribeca Film Festival.

References

External links 
 
 
 
 
 

2009 films
American independent films
2009 romantic comedy films
American romantic comedy films
2009 independent films
2000s English-language films
2000s American films